Commander Fleet Activities Chinhae (hanja: 鎭海 艦隊支援部隊), also known as CFAC, is a United States Navy's unit in the Jinhae-gu of Changwon, South Korea. It is located near Busan and is the only U.S. naval base in mainland Asia.

History
Originally a U.S. Naval Advisory Group in 1946, CFAC eventually evolved into the first Fleet Detachment, Naval Station, JUSMAG-K and then reorganized as the Chinhae Facility in 1972. Since the 1972 reorganization and renaming to "Field Logistics Center, Chinhae." Subsequent reorganizations resulted in the current Commander, Fleet Activities, Chinhae with Commander, U.S. Naval Forces, Detachment Chinhae as a tenant activity.

See also
Busan Naval Base
Republic of Korea Navy

References

External links
Official website

Changwon
Military units and formations established in 1946
United States Navy installations
Military installations of the United States in South Korea